Amy Louise Robbins (born 18 February 1971) is an English stage, film and TV actress best known for her role as Dr. Jill Weatherill in the British television series The Royal. Before her role in The Royal she played Police Sergeant Rachel James in the BBC One hospital drama Casualty. Robbins has appeared in many TV series including  Emmerdale, EastEnders, Coronation Street, Hollyoaks, Holby City, World's End, Where the Heart Is, Happiness, My Hero, Heartbeat, Dalziel and Pascoe, The Slammer, Doctors, People Like Us and Noah's Ark.

Career 
The 1986 Granada Television sketch show Robbins featured her brother Ted Robbins and sisters Jane, Emma and Kate Robbins, along with herself guest appearing in various episodes.

She then went on to train at RADA.

Before landing her role as Dr Jill Weatherill in The Royal, Robbins played a recurring character, Police Sergeant Rachel James in the BBC One hospital drama Casualty for one series.
Robbins also appeared in the BAFTA winning  TV film 'My Beautiful Son 'playing the part of Maureen opposite Julie Walters.

She played Mrs Johnstone in Blood Brothers, from 1 August 2011 to the end of January 2012, at the Phoenix Theatre, London.
She worked at Chichester Festival Theatre in The Accrington Pals with actress Katherine Kelly and has appeared in many more stage productions including A Day in the Death of Joe Egg.

In 2011, Robbins performed for the Queen at Buckingham Palace in A Celebration of Youth in the Arts with RADA, playing the part of Lady Capulet alongside actors Anne Reid and Bryony Hannah.

In April and May 2013 Robbins played Titania/Hippolyta in A Midsummer Night's Dream at the Royal & Derngate Theatre, Northampton.

In October 2013, she appeared in Sarah Rutherford's "Adult Supervision" at Park Theatre (London).

In 2014, she filmed World's End, a series of 36 15-minute episodes for CBBC. World's End premiers on 30 March 2015.

From January to May 2016 Amy starred  alongside her husband Robert Daws in Bill Kenright's touring production of Rehearsal For Murder.

In March 2017, Robbins joined the cast of Channel 4 soap opera, Hollyoaks, as Lynette Drinkwell, the mother of Scott Drinkwell, played by Ross Adams, and the sister of Diane O'Connor, portrayed by Alex Fletcher.

In 2023, she joined the cast of ITV1 soap opera, Coronation Street, as Christina Boyd, the mother of established character Daisy Midgeley, played by Charlotte Jordan.

Personal life 
Youngest of five children, Robbins was born in Higher Bebington to an acting family and trained at RADA. She also received an English and Drama degree from Goldsmiths, University of London. In February 2003, she married her The Royal co-star Robert Daws who plays Dr. Gordon Ormerod (who later became her screen husband). The couple have two children. She is a first cousin once removed of ex-Beatle Paul McCartney and the younger sister of Ted Robbins and Kate Robbins, impressionist and actress. Robbins also has two other sisters and is the aunt of actress Emily Atack. Her grandfather, Ted, served as the secretary of the Football Association of Wales for more than 35 years.

Filmography

Theatre credits

References

External links

1971 births
Alumni of Goldsmiths, University of London
Alumni of RADA
People from Bebington
English television actresses
English soap opera actresses
Living people